Agudo may refer to:

Agudo, Rio Grande do Sul, Brazil
Agudo, Ciudad Real, Spain